Vegetable Cookery: With an Introduction, Recommending Abstinence from Animal Food and Intoxicating Liquors is the first vegetarian cookbook, authored anonymously by Martha Brotherton (1783–1861) of Salford. It was first published as A New System of Vegetable Cookery in periodical form in 1812. A second book edition appeared in 1821 and a third was published by Horatio Phillips of London in 1829 under its best known title Vegetable Cookery.

The first edition was published anonymously by a "member of the Bible Christian Church". The fourth edition published in 1833 by Effingham Wilson, contained 1,261 recipes and was also published anonymously "by a lady". Martha's husband Joseph Brotherton wrote the introduction for the book. Two further editions appeared in 1839 and 1852. The 1852 edition contains a foreword by James Simpson, the first president of the Vegetarian Society.

It was the first published vegetarian cookbook. Martha and Joseph Brotherton were leading members of William Cowherd's Bible Christian Church.

The recipes are ovo-lacto vegetarian. Many of the recipes involve copious amounts of butter. Historians have noted that "Brotherton's book served as a guide for Americans who began to self-identify as vegetarian in the early decades of the nineteenth century." Kathryn Gleadle has written that the book "was enormously important to the movement, forming the basis of most subsequent works on vegetable cookery."

References

External links
Vegetable Cookery: With an Introduction, Recommending Abstinence from Animal Food and Intoxicating Liquors (1833 edition)

1812 non-fiction books
1833 non-fiction books
19th-century British cookbooks
English non-fiction books
Vegetarian cookbooks
Works published anonymously